Route 55 may refer to:

Route 55 (MTA Maryland), a bus route in Baltimore, Maryland and its suburbs
London Buses route 55
Melbourne tram route 55

See also
List of highways numbered 55

55